A whip is a slender, unbranched shoot or plant.  This term is used typically in forestry to refer to unbranched young tree seedlings of approximately 0.5-1.0 m (1 ft 7 in-3 ft 3 in) in height and 2–3 years old, that have been grown for planting out.

References

Forest management
Horticulture